Carlo Tognoli (16 June 1938 – 5 March 2021) was an Italian politician, who was Mayor of Milan and minister of the Italian Republic.

Biography
Tognoli was born at Milan and joined the Italian Socialist Party (Partito Socialista Italiano, or PSI) in 1958.

Elected into the Italian Chamber of Deputies, he was also Mayor of Milan from 1976 to 1986. In 1984–1987 he was also elected to the European Parliament; in the latter year he was appointed Minister of Problems of Urban Areas in the cabinets of Giovanni Goria and Ciriaco De Mita. Later he was  Minister of Tourism and Spectacles in the 6th and 7th Giulio Andreotti governments.

From 1981 to 1992 he was a journalist and director of the monthly newspaper Critica Sociale.

In 1992 he was involved in the Tangentopoli scandal together with hisl party colleague Paolo Pillitteri (who had been his successor as mayor of Milan). Tognoli subsequently abandoned political activity and in 1995 obtained a position in Mediobanca thanks to the intercession of Enrico Cuccia.

Tognoli died in Milan on 5 March 2021, at the age of 82, from complications from COVID-19 during the COVID-19 pandemic in Italy.

References

External links
 Online biography 
 

1938 births
2021 deaths
Italian Socialist Party politicians
Mayors of Milan
Bocconi University alumni
Deaths from the COVID-19 pandemic in Lombardy
Government ministers of Italy